Álvaro Andrés Ormeño Salazar (born 4 April 1979) is a Chilean former professional footballer who operated as a right back or wing back.

Club career
Ormeño began his career at Colo-Colo youth ranks aged fifteen. After failing to be promoted to first adult team, he played for Club Social y Deportivo Cristiano Hosanna in the Chilean Tercera División. Next, he joined Ñublense in the 2000–01 season and then to Deportes Ovalle. In January 2002, he signed for Primera División club Santiago Morning. Ormeño returned to Colo-Colo after his two-year spell at Everton.

International career
In 2007, he made five appearances for Chile national team at both the Copa América and friendly matches.

Personal life
He is the son of Raúl Ormeño, a historical player of Colo-Colo and the Chile national team, and the older brother of the also footballer .

Honours

Club
Colo-Colo
 Primera División de Chile: 2006 Apertura, 2006 Clausura
 Copa Sudamericana: Runner-up 2006

References

External links
 
 
 Argentine Primera statistics at Fútbol XXI 

1979 births
Living people
Sportspeople from Viña del Mar
Association football fullbacks
Chilean footballers
Chilean expatriate footballers
Chile international footballers
Ñublense footballers
Deportes Ovalle footballers
Santiago Morning footballers
Everton de Viña del Mar footballers
Colo-Colo footballers
Club de Gimnasia y Esgrima La Plata footballers
Deportes Iquique footballers
Rangers de Talca footballers
Tercera División de Chile players
Primera B de Chile players
Chilean Primera División players
Argentine Primera División players
Chilean expatriate sportspeople in Argentina
Expatriate footballers in Argentina
2007 Copa América players